The Asian American Theater Company (AATC) is a non-profit theatre performance company based in San Francisco. Its stated mission is "To connect people to Asian American culture through theatre".

Background
The Asian American Theater Company was established in 1973 by playwright Frank Chin to develop and present original works of theatre about Americans of Asian and Pacific Islander descent. AATC is credited as a progenitor of the Asian-American theater movement alongside East West Players and Pan Asian Repertory Theatre.

In addition to being a producing company, AATC is a workshop where Asian Pacific Islander writers, actors and directors can explore ideas and create works that carry with them the AATC's purpose, which is to explore who Asian Pacific Islander Americans are as a people and as a community.

For many years the Asian American Theater Company was housed in The Asian American Theater Center located near the corner of Arguello and Clement Streets in San Francisco's ethnically diverse Richmond district. The Theater Center suffered much damage from the 1989 Loma Prieta earthquake, but was able to re-open its doors a year later. The costly repairs however created a heavy economic burden and in 1996 the Asian American Theater Company moved its administrative offices to Japantown, and produced its plays in various theater venues throughout the city such as the Off-Market Theater and the Thick House. Today the administrative offices reside in San Francisco's Potrero Hill neighborhood at 1695 18th Street.

Programs

The company's main stage productions are new plays and revivals of classics by Asian Pacific Islander American playwrights, directed, performed and designed by local talent.  Most scripts will have been developed at AATC and each will be presented at various venues around the Bay Area with full-production run.

Under its emerging artists project, young actors, many  of whom are making their acting debut, perform plays by new playwrights or revivals of classics by established artists.  Many of the actors and writers taking part in the Emerging Artists Project have participated in the Training Program.

The group hosts staged readings, where scripts under development are directed, rehearsed and presented, followed by discussion and critique.  Readings are free or a nominal donation is requested.  Scripts from women and under-represented Asian Pacific Islander groups are especially welcome.

A training program consisting of two semesters a year of courses in acting, scene study, voice and movement and playwright's workshops, conducted by professional artists, offered at low cost.

Alumni
Many well known Asian American actors and playwrights have been associated with AATC productions in the past.  Notable alumni:

Actors
 Michael Paul Chan
 Dennis Dun
 Amy Hill
 Rodney Kageyama
 Lane Nishikawa
 Greg Watanabe
 Victor Wong

Playwrights
 Frank Chin
 Philip Kan Gotanda
 Hiroshi Kashiwagi
 Ken Narasaki
 Rick Shiomi

See also
 Asian American theatre

References

External links
 AATC website
 Guide to the Asian American Theater Company Archives, California Ethnic and Multicultural Archives, UC Santa Barbara Library.
 Guide to the Annotated Catalog to Productions and Scripts in the Asian American Theater Company Archives, California Ethnic and Multicultural Archives, UC Santa Barbara Library.

Asian-American theatre
Theatre companies in San Francisco
Asian-American organizations
Non-profit organizations based in San Francisco
Arts organizations based in the San Francisco Bay Area
Arts organizations established in 1973
Performing groups established in 1973
1973 establishments in California